Inside Outing is an isometric action-adventure game released by The Edge in 1988 for the ZX Spectrum, Amstrad CPC and Commodore 64. In 1989, it was released for the Atari ST and Amiga with the title Raffles with the 8-bit versions re-released with this name. It was released in the U.S. by Epyx as Devon Aire in the Hidden Diamond Caper.

Plot 
An eccentric millionaire has died without leaving a will, instead hiding his money and gems in obscure places around his large house. His widow has hired a professional thief to find and retrieve these items. However, the dead millionaire's strange pets have now overrun the mansion and do not take kindly to interlopers.

Gameplay 
Inside Outing uses the Worldmaker graphic development system that was pioneered by The Edge's 1986 game, Fairlight. The player controls a thief, named "Raffles" in some versions of the game and "Devon Aire" in others, who must explore a large mansion looking for valuables, while avoiding the various hostile creatures that inhabit the house.

Reviews 
Sinclair User: "You may be surprised at just how intimidating a canary can be... Without a doubt, the best 3D game since Head Over Heels."

References

External links 

Devon Aire in the Hidden Diamond Caper at Atari Mania
Raffles at Lemon Amiga

1988 video games
Action-adventure games
Amiga games
Amstrad CPC games
Atari ST games
Commodore 64 games
Commodore CDTV games
Epyx games
Single-player video games
Video games developed in the United Kingdom
Video games with isometric graphics
ZX Spectrum games